Krishna V. Shenoy (1968-2023) was an American neuroscientist and neuroengineer  at Stanford University. Shenoy focused on motor and computational neuroscience, neuroengineering, brain-computer interfaces (BCIs) and neurotechnology. Throughout his lifetime, he published over 140 journal articles. On 21 January 2023, he died after a long battle with pancreatic cancer.

Research
Shenoy obtained a BS in Electrical and Computer Engineering from UC Irvine (1987-1990) and a PhD in Electrical Engineering and Computer Science from MIT (1990-1995). He was then a postdoctoral fellow in Neurobiology at Caltech (1995-2001).   

In 2001, Shenoy joined the Department of Electrical Engineering at Stanford University as an Assistant Professor and was promoted to Associate Professor in 2008 and to Full Professor in 2012. In 2017 he was appointed as the inaugural Hong Seh and Vivian W. M. Lim (endowed chair) Professor.  He also held courtesy appointments in the departments of  Bioengineering, Neurobiology and Neurosurgery. 

At Stanford, Shenoy was a member of the Wu Tsai Neurosciences Institute and the Bio-X Institute. He was the Director of Stanford's Neural Prosthetic Systems Laboratory and the co-director of the Neural Prosthetics Translational Laboratory at Stanford University. In 2015 Shenoy became an investigator with the Howard Hughes Medical Institute (HHMI). 

In 2022 Shenoy was elected member of the National Academy of Medicine “For making seminal contributions both to basic neuroscience and to translational and clinical research. His work has shown how networks of motor cortical neurons operate as dynamical systems, and he has developed new technologies to provide new means of restoring movement and communication to people with paralysis.”

In 2022 he was also elected as a Fellow of the IEEE “For contributions to cortical control of movement and brain-computer interfaces.”

Patents

 Brain machine interfaces incorporating neural population dynamics. US9095455B2. Jonathan C. Kao, Paul Nuyujukian, Mark M. Churchland, John P. Cunningham, Krishna V. Shenoy. https://patents.google.com/patent/US9095455?oq=krishna+shenoy
 Brain machine interface utilizing a discrete action state decoder in parallel with a continuous decoder for a neural prosthetic device. US9373088B2. Paul Nuyujukian, Jonathan C. Kao, Krishna V Shenoy. https://patents.google.com/patent/US9373088?oq=krishna+shenoy
 Brain machine interface. US8792976B2. Vikash Gilja, Paul Nuyujukian, Cynthia A Chestek, John P Cunningham, Byron M. Yu, Stephen I Ryu, Krishna V. Shenoy. https://patents.google.com/patent/US8792976?oq=krishna+shenoy
 Brain-Machine Interface Utilizing Interventions to Emphasize Aspects of Neural Variance and Decode Speed and Angle. US20150245928A1. Jonathan C. Kao, Chethan Pandarinath, Paul Nuyujukian, Krishna V. Shenoy. https://patents.google.com/patent/US20150245928?oq=krishna+shenoy
 Decoding of neural signals for movement control. US7058445B2. Caleb T. Kemere, Gopal Santhanam, Byron M. Yu, Teresa H. Meng, Krishna V. Shenoy. https://patents.google.com/patent/US7058445?oq=krishna+shenoy
 Cognitive state machine for prosthetic systems. WO2003005934A3. Richard A Andersen, Joel W Burdick, Shiyan Cao, Daniella Meeker, Partha Mitra, Bijan Pesaran, Krishna V Shenoy. https://patents.google.com/patent/WO2003005934A3/en?oq=krishna+shenoy
 Cognitive state machine for prosthetic systems. US20030023319A1. Richard Andersen, Bijan Pesaran, Partha Mitra, Daniella Meeker, Krishna Shenoy, Shiyan Cao, Joel Burdick. https://patents.google.com/patent/US20030023319?oq=krishna+shenoy
 Processed neural signals and methods for generating and using them. US6609017B1. Krishna V. Shenoy, Richard A. Andersen, Sohaib A. Kureshi. https://patents.google.com/patent/US6609017?oq=krishna+shenoy

Links 

Krishna Shenoy, from Stanford Engineering
 Google Scholar
 Neural Prosthetics Translational Laboratory at Stanford University

References

1968 births
American electrical engineers
Living people
Stanford University School of Engineering faculty
Stanford University Department of Electrical Engineering faculty